Mean Sonyta (born 10 February 1990) is a Cambodian actress and fashion model. Sonyta joined a local beauty contest Freshie Girls & Boys (season 8) 2009. She was a 3rd runner up with an award of Miss Popular. She began her career in 2009. She entered the film industry and starred in her debut film បេះដូងអ្នកការពារ which was a lead to local audiences. Then her big hit on screen was a series of Loy9 and Love9 film by BBC Media Action Cambodia.

Films

 2009: បេះដូងអ្នកការពារ 
 2012: នាយឡប់ជំពប់ស្នេហ៍
 2013: អ្នកមានគុណ
 2014: ស្នេហ៍៩
 2017: ស្នេហ៍ស្វ័យគុណ៤ 
 2018: ផ្កាថ្ម

Awards and honours

 2009: Freshie Girls & Boys (season 8) 3rd runner up
 2013: Miss Popular Magazine Cover

See also

 List of Khmer film actors

References

1. Mean Sonita too busy for love. The Cambodia Herald. Retrieved 1 July 2012. 
2. TV family inspiring discussion on tricky issues. The Phnom Penh Post. Retrieved 3 October 2015. 
3. Mean Sonyta Describes Her Skincare Routine. Khmer Times. Retrieved 4 May 2016. 
4. Reviving Krama Fashion. Khmer Times. Retrieved 23 September 2015. 
5. Mean Sonyta. World Most Beautiful Faces. Retrieved 15 November 014. 
6. ឈុតប៊ីគីនីសិចស៊ីពី មាន សូនីតា ធ្វើឲ្យអ្នកគាំទ្របារម្ភ. Post Khmer. Retrieved 6 July 2016. 
7. តោះមកស្គាល់គូស្នេហ៍ពិសេសទី២ក្នុងរឿង "ស្នេហ៍ស្វ័យគុណ៤" ទាំងអស់គ្នា!. Sabay News. Retrieved 28 December 2016. 
8. អីយ៉ា! ឈុតថ្មីរបស់ មាន សូនីតា ច្នៃម៉ូតថ្មីចម្រុះគ្នា មានទាំងបុរាណ និងសម័យ មិនធម្មតា!. KhmerLoad. Retrieved 27 May 2017.

External links
 Official website
 IMDb
 Mean Sonyta on Facebook

Cambodian film actresses
Living people
1990 births
People from Kampong Cham province